Flush deck is a term in naval architecture. It can refer to any deck of a ship which is continuous from stem to stern.

History
The flush deck design originated with rice ships built in Bengal Subah, Mughal India (modern Bangladesh), resulting in hulls that were stronger and less leak-prone than stepped deck ships.. This was a key innovation in shipbuilding. The British East India Company duplicated the flush deck design in the 1760s, leading to significant improvements in seaworthiness of British ships during the Industrial Revolution.

Two different meanings of "flush"

"Flush deck" with "flush" in its generic meaning of "even or level; forming an unbroken plane", is sometimes applied to vessels, as in describing yachts lacking a raised pilothouse for instance. "Flush deck aircraft carrier" uses "flush deck" in this generic sense.

"Flush deck" in its more specific maritime-architecture sense denotes (for instance) the flush deck destroyers described above: the flush decks are broken by masts, guns, funnels, and other structures and impediments, and are far from being unbroken planes. "Flush deck" in this sense only signifies that the main deck runs the length of the ship and does not end before the stem (with a separate raised forecastle deck forward) or before the stern (with a separate raised or, as seen on many modern warships, lowered quarterdeck rearward).

Types
It has two specific common referents:
Flush deck aircraft carriers are those with no island superstructure, so that the top deck of the vessel consists of only an unbroken flight deck. 

References

Shipbuilding
Naval architecture
Bangladeshi inventions
Indian inventions